Kömürlü is a village in Bozyazı district of Mersin Province, Turkey.It is situated to the north of Bozyazı . The population of the village was 345. as of 2012.

References

Villages in Bozyazı District